Bossiaea simulata is a species of flowering plant in the family Fabaceae and is endemic to inland areas of Western Australia. It is a compact shrub with sharply-pointed cladodes and yellow, pea-like flowers sometimes with red markings.

Description
Muelleria 23: |journal=Muelleria |date=2006 |volume=11 |pages=132–135 |url=https://www.biodiversitylibrary.org/item/278250#page/134/mode/1up |access-date=5 September 2021}}</ref>

Taxonomy and namingBossiaea simulata was first formally described in 1994 by James Henderson Ross in the journal Muelleria from specimens collected near Mount Willgonarinya in 1997. The specific epithet (simulata) means "imitating" or "resembling", referring to the superficial resemblance of this species to Bossiaea celata.

Distribution and habitat
This bossiaea grows in low Eucalyptus woodland from Mount Malcolm near Leonora to Mount Willgonarinya, in the Coolgardie and Mallee biogeographic regions of inland Western Australia.

Conservation statusBossiaea simulata'' is classified as "Priority Two" by the Western Australian Government Department of Biodiversity, Conservation and Attractions, meaning that it is poorly known and from only one or a few locations.

References

simulata
Mirbelioids
Flora of Western Australia
Plants described in 1994